Maassenia heydeni is a moth of the family Sphingidae. It is known from Madagascar and the Comoro Islands.

The wingspan is 50–80 mm. The forewing outer margin is slightly crenulated. The forewing upperside ground colour is brown, with paler beige areas. The antemedian band and spots along the costa are paler. The basal band is dark brown, curved and not reaching the inner margin. There is a dark brown diffuse line running from near the middle of the costa to the tornus. The discal spot is composed of a two- to three-pointed silver spot with arms directed distally and a smaller rounded silver dot basally, which is sometimes absent. The forewing underside is brown with a conspicuous orange postmedian band and a darker marginal band.

Subspecies
Maassenia heydeni heydeni (Madagascar)
Maassenia heydeni comorana Rothschild & Jordan, 1915 (Comoro Islands)

References

Macroglossini
Moths described in 1884
Moths of Madagascar
Moths of the Comoros